Fox College is a Private for-profit college with its main campus in Tinley Park, Illinois. It originally was founded in 1932 and most students come from the Chicago area. Fox College awards diplomas and associate degrees.

Academics 
Fox College provides career-focused courses to high school graduates. The programs are accelerated in nature and operate on a year-round calendar.  Fox’s programs generally offer hands-on learning opportunities that help prepare graduates to start working immediately. Some programs offer externships as well. Associate degree programs can be completed in 12–20 months. Fox College groups its four major areas of study into the Health Care category.

Accreditation 

Fox College is accredited by the Higher Learning Commission. Fox College's Medical Assisting Program is accredited by the Accrediting Bureau of Health Education Schools. The Veterinary Technician program is accredited by the Committee on Veterinary Technician Education and Activities (CVTEA) of the American Veterinary Medical Association (AVMA). The Occupational Therapy Assistant (OTA) Program is currently accredited by the Accreditation Council for Occupational Therapy Education (ACOTE) of the American Occupational Therapy Association (AOTA).  The Physical Therapist Assistant program at Fox College is currently accredited by the Commission on Accreditation in Physical Therapy Education (CAPTE).  Fox College is approved to grant Associate of Applied Science degrees by the Illinois Board of Higher Education.

References

For-profit universities and colleges in the United States
Universities and colleges in Chicago
1932 establishments in Illinois
Private universities and colleges in Illinois